Christian Riganò (born 25 May 1974) is an Italian football manager and former professional footballer who played as a striker.

Career

Early career
Riganò was born in Lipari, Province of Messina. A former bricklayer, he started his career with amateur team Lipari, where he gained a reputation of a prolific striker. In 1997, he moved to then Serie D team Messina, but he failed to impress there. This was followed by two season with Igea Virtus, another Serie D team, and 28 goals with the Sicilian side.

Taranto
In 2000, at the age of 26, Riganò finally entered into professional football with Taranto, being instrumental in the rossoblu'''s promotion in their first season, and an impressive Serie C1 campaign the following year, being crowned Serie C1's topscorer with 27 goals in the 2001–02 season, and narrowly missing out on promotion to Serie B.

Florentia
In 2002, Riganò joined Florentia Viola of Serie C2, and scored a personal record of 30 goals in 32 matches, earning the title of top-scorer in the league once again and helping Fiorentina to obtain promotion. During the 2003–04 season, he scored 23 Serie B goals in 44 matches, helping Fiorentina to win promotion to Serie A and earning his Serie A debut at the age of 30 the following season. During the 2005–06 winter transfer window, he was loaned to Empoli with little success.

Messina
In August 2006 Riganò moved to Messina, making a very impressive season, scoring 19 goals in 26 appearances. He finished third on the top scorer chart in Serie A during the 2006–07 season, despite having sustained an injury in January which saw him miss action for three months.

Levante and loans
In August 2007 Riganò signed for Levante UD but scored only four goals in 13 matches during his six-month stay with the Spanish side (three of which came in a hat-trick against Almería, making him the second Italian player after Christian Vieri to score a hat-trick in La Liga), being then loaned out to Siena during the January transfer window.

He was released by Levante after the Valencian club went relegated to Segunda División.

Later years
Free agent Riganò joined Lega Pro Prima Divisione club Ternana on 31 August 2008. His time at Ternana however proved to be disappointing, as Riganò played only a handful of matches, being then excluded from the first team on November. On 2 February 2009 Riganò accepted a permanent move to Cremonese, another Lega Pro Prima Divisione club, where he re-joined Emiliano Mondonico, his former head coach at Fiorentina. He successively left Cremonese at the end of the season, and signed with Italian club San Frediano Rondinella S.S., the second team of Florence.

Style of play
A large and tall striker who excelled in the air, Riganò was neither fast nor particularly powerful, but was known for his opportunism, anticipation, heading accuracy and eye for goal, despite his poor work-rate and struggles with fitness and weight-gain in his later career; due to his prolific goalscoring and place of birth, he earned the nicknames il bomber di Lipari and Riga-Gol''. A former defender, he was a well-rounded forward, who possessed excellent movement, timing, and positional sense, which made him a difficult player to mark. Usually deployed as a centre-forward, he was also capable of using his physical strength and technical skills to hold up the ball for his team-mates when playing with his back to goal, and of providing them with assists in addition to scoring goals himself, and was an accurate penalty taker.

Honours

Club
Taranto
Serie C2: 2000–01

Florentia Viola
Serie C2: 2002–03

Individual
Serie C1 Top-scorer: 2001–02 (27 goals)
Serie C2 Top-scorer 2002–03 (30 goals)
 Fiorentina Hall of Fame

References

External links
Gazzetta.it career profile 

1974 births
Living people
People from Lipari
Sportspeople from the Province of Messina
Association football forwards
Italian footballers
A.S.D. Igea Virtus Barcellona players
Taranto F.C. 1927 players
ACF Fiorentina players
Empoli F.C. players
A.C.R. Messina players
Levante UD footballers
A.C.N. Siena 1904 players
Ternana Calcio players
U.S. Cremonese players
Serie A players
Serie B players
Serie C players
Italian expatriate footballers
Expatriate footballers in Spain
Italian expatriate sportspeople in Spain
Footballers from Sicily